Ridge is an unincorporated community in St. Mary's County, Maryland, United States. Bard's Field was listed on the National Register of Historic Places in 1976. It is near the southernmost tip of the western shore of Maryland, known as Point Lookout, has bodies of water on both sides, and has two popular seafood restaurants.  A historically black Roman Catholic church is here, which formerly had a parochial school.

Oblate Sisters of Providence

The Oblate Sisters of Providence, an African American order of Catholic Nuns, maintained a convent associated with St. Peter Clavers Catholic Church and worked with the local African American Catholic community in the first half of the 20th century. They also helped to run a local Catholic High school.

Notable person

Louise Daniel Hutchinson, a historian of African American history, was born in Ridge.

References

Unincorporated communities in St. Mary's County, Maryland
Unincorporated communities in Maryland

Zip code 20653 is for Lexington Park ,Md. Ridge zip is 20680